St John & St Matthews Church, South Hornchurch, is an Anglican parish church in South Hornchurch, London Borough of Havering, England.

History 
The church was made by Bishop of Barking on 9 March 1957.

References

External links

South Hornchurch
20th-century Church of England church buildings